The Chrysler Classic was a golf tournament held in Australia from 1973 to 1976. Prize money was A$50,000. Bob Shearer won the event twice in the four years it was held.

Winners

In 1976 Shearer won at the first extra hole.

References

Former PGA Tour of Australasia events
Golf tournaments in Australia
Recurring sporting events established in 1973
Recurring events disestablished in 1976